Jamie Sue Sherrill, professionally known as Nurse Jamie, is an American nurse , celebrity skin expert,  television executive producer and realty television personality. She is a contributor on Extra and E! News.

Career 
Sherrill is the co-owner of Beauty Park Medical Spa in Santa Monica, California. She also has her own line of beauty care products called Nurse Jamie Healthy Skin Solutions.

She is also the executive producer and talent on the American reality television series Skin Decision: Before and After on Netflix. The series was nominated for the Daytime Emmy Award for “Outstanding Lifestyle Series” in 2021.

References

21st-century American businesspeople
Living people
American television personalities
American women television personalities
American cosmetics businesspeople
American retail chief executives
American reality television producers
American women television producers
American nurses
American women nurses
21st-century American businesswomen
1971 births